The Cannstatter Volksfest is an annual three-week Volksfest (beer festival and travelling funfair) in Stuttgart, Germany. It is sometimes also referred to by foreign visitors as the Stuttgart Beer Festival, although it is actually more of an autumnal fair.

The festival takes place at the Cannstatter Wasen from late September to early October, spanning a period over three weekends, ending the second Sunday in October. The extensive Wasen area is in the Stuttgart city district of Bad Cannstatt, near the river Neckar. A smaller variant of the Stuttgart festival, the Stuttgart Spring Festival, is also held each year in Wasen.

Background 
Although the Volksfest is not strictly speaking a beer festival, it is considered by many to be the second largest beer celebration in the world after the Munich Oktoberfest. According to estimates about 4.2 million people visited the festival in 2006. The Volksfest begins one week later than the Oktoberfest.

Parade 
Traditionally a parade also takes place at the Wasen, usually on the first Sunday. In 1954 a record number of spectators attended the parade along the route from Stuttgart's central square to the Wasen site: 300,000. The    Mohrenköpfle   is a pig in the parade. On the orders of King Wilhelm I, masked pigs (Maskenschweine?) were imported from Central China in 1820/21, in order to improve pig breeding in the kingdom of Baden-Württemberg. This crossbreeding with the "Chinese pigs" was particularly successful within the stocks of domestic pigs in the Hohenlohe region and the area around the town of Schwäbisch Hall.

References

External links

1818 establishments in Germany
Beer festivals in Germany
Festivals in Stuttgart
Annual events in Germany
Festivals established in 1818
19th-century establishments in Württemberg
Autumn events in Germany
COVID-19 pandemic in Germany